Journal of Nepal Medical Association (JNMA) is an open-access peer-reviewed medical journal from Nepal. It was established in 1963, making it one of Nepal's oldest medical journals. 
It is published by Nepal Medical Association,  a professional association of doctors in Nepal. The current editor-in-chief of JNMA is Angel Magar, who was appointed in Jan 2013.

History 
The journal began publishing in September 1963. The  first chief editor was Mrigendra Raj Pandey, Cardiologist from Bir Hospital. He is also the first Chairman of Nepal Health Research Council.

Indexing 
JNMA is abstracted and indexed in the following bibliographic databases:

Past editors 
Past editors include the following:

 Mrigendra Raj Pandey  (1963–1964)
 Hemang Dixit (1965–1967)
 BP Sharma (1967–1968)
 Moin Shah (1969–1970)
 YB Shrestha (1971–1972)
 Santosh Man Shrestha (1973)
 PR Satyal (1974–1976)
 Shyam Bahadur Pandey (1977–1978)
 Sanjib Dhungel (1979)
 Shyam Bahadur Pandey (1980)
 Tej S Malla (1981–1983)
 Narayan Bahadur Thapa(1984–1985)
 Sanjib Dhungel (1986)
 Ramesh Kant  Adhikari (1987–1988)
 Mahendra Nepal (1989)
 Rakesh Prasad (1990)
 Mohan P Joshi (1991)
 Neelam Adhikari (1992)
 Nirakar Man Shrestha (1993)
 Bhagavat P Nepal (1994)
 Babu Ram Marasini (1995–1997)
 Ugra Narayan Pathak (1997–1998)
 Sudha Sharma (1999–2001)
 Ramesh P Acharya (2002–2004)
 Achala Vaidya (2005–2006)
 Kusum Thapa (2007–2011)
 Rabindra Pradhan (2011–2012)
 Angel Magar (2013–present)

References 

General medical journals
Open access journals
Publications established in 1963